Mainliner: Wreckage from the Past is a collection of early recordings by Social Distortion. It was released on July 18, 1995, and contains songs which were recorded in 1981. It is a collection of singles and B-sides that had never appeared on any of the band's full-length albums (except for "Moral Threat" and "All the Answers"). This album was released by Mike Ness' Time Bomb Recordings (distributed by Arista Records) in 1995 along with the re-release of Mommy's Little Monster and Prison Bound.

Track listing
All songs written by Mike Ness unless otherwise noted.
 "1945" (Posh Boy Version) – 1:52
 "Playpen" (Posh Boy Version) – 2:40
 "Mainliner" – 2:30
 "Moral Threat" – 3:35
 "All the Answers" – 2:12
 "Justice for All" – 2:03
 "Under My Thumb" (Mick Jagger/Keith Richards) – 2:04
 "1945" (13th Floor Version) – 2:03
 "Playpen" (13th Floor Version) – 2:58
 "Mass Hysteria" – 2:41 (Ness/Liles)

"Justice for All" was later rerecorded by Social Distortion in 1988 for their second album, Prison Bound, as "It's the Law".

"Justice For All" and the Posh Boy version of "Playpen" first appeared on the compilation cassette The Future Looks Bright, released by Posh Boy with side A containing Posh Boy produced bands and side B containing SST artists.

The Posh Boy version of "1945" first appeared on the compilation album Rodney on the ROQ, Volume 2.

"Moral Threat" and "All the Answers" were later rerecorded by Social Distortion in 1982 for the band's first album, Mommy's Little Monster.

 Mainliner: Wreckage from the Past features the only recordings by Social Distortion in which Brent Liles performs vocals

Personnel
Mike Ness - guitar, vocals all tracks
Dennis Danell - bass guitar and vocals (tracks 1-6), rhythm guitar and vocals (tracks 7-10)
John "Carrot" Stevenson- drums, vocals (tracks 1-6)
Brent Liles - bass guitar, vocals (tracks 7-10)
Derek O'Brien - drums, vocals (tracks 7-10)

References

Social Distortion albums
1995 compilation albums
Time Bomb Recordings compilation albums